Clelland is a surname and Scottish clan. It is the surname of:
David Clelland (born 1943), British Labour Party politician
Eugene Clelland, fictional character on British television soap opera Coronation Street
Jeanne N. Clelland, American mathematician
James Clelland, Scottish labor activist, participant in the 1820 Battle of Bonnymuir
John Clelland (1863–1944), Scottish international footballer
John Clelland, founder in 1883 of Globe Store, Scranton, Pennsylvania
Lana Clelland (born 1993), Scottish footballer
Mike Clelland (born 1963), American Democratic Party politician
Sarah Clelland (born 1997), Scottish footballer
Scott Clelland, manager of Scottish football club Darvel F.C.

See also
Cleland (surname), a related surname
Clelland Bar, one of the sites of the 1979 Glasgow pub bombings.
Clelland House, a historic building in West Virginia
Clelland F. Dodds (1826–1894), Mayor of Bloomington, Indiana
Lady Maisry, a song (Child Ballad 65) also known as Susie Clelland
McClelland, a related surname